Agriomelissa is a genus of moths in the family Sesiidae.

Species
Agriomelissa aethiopica (Le Cerf, 1917)
Agriomelissa amblyphaea (Hampson, 1919)
Agriomelissa brevicornis (Aurivillius, 1905)
Agriomelissa gypsospora  Meyrick, 1931
Agriomelissa malagasy (Viette, 1982)
Agriomelissa ursipes (Walker, 1856)
Agriomelissa victrix (Le Cerf, 1916)

References

Sesiidae